Richard is a male given name. It originates, via Old French, from Old Frankish and is a compound of the words descending from Proto-Germanic *rīk- 'ruler, leader, king' and *hardu- 'strong, brave, hardy', and it therefore means 'strong in rule'. Nicknames include "Richie", "Dick", "Dickon", "Dickie", "Rich", "Rick", "Rico", "Ricky", and more. 

Richard is a common English (the name was introduced into England by the Normans), German and French male name. It's also used in many more languages, particularly Germanic, such as Norwegian, Danish, Swedish, Icelandic, and Dutch, as well as other languages including Irish, Scottish, Welsh and Finnish. Richard is cognate with variants of the name in other European languages, such as the Swedish "Rickard", the Catalan "Ricard" and the Italian "Riccardo", among others (see comprehensive variant list below).

People named Richard

Multiple people with the same name 

 Richard Andersen (disambiguation)
 Richard Anderson (disambiguation)
 Richard Cartwright (disambiguation)
 Richard Chase (disambiguation)
 Richard Green (disambiguation)
 Richard Greene (disambiguation)
 Richard Griffith (disambiguation)
 Richard Griffiths (disambiguation)
 Richard Marks (disambiguation)
 Richard Rodgers (disambiguation)
 Richard Rogers (disambiguation)
 Richard Walsh (disambiguation)
 Richard Welch (disambiguation)
 Richard Wilkins (disambiguation)
 Richard Wilson (disambiguation)

Rulers and heads of state 

 Richard, Duke of Burgundy (858–921)
 Richard I of Normandy (933–996), Duke of Normandy
 Richard II, Duke of Normandy (died 1026), son of Richard I of Normandy
 Richard I of Capua (died 1078), King of Capua and Count of Aversa
 Richard I of England or Richard the Lionheart (1157–1199)
 Richard of Cornwall (1209–1272), 1st Earl of Cornwall, elected King of Germany
 Richard II of England (1367–1400)
 Richard III of England (1452–1485)
 Richard Cromwell (1626–1712), son and successor of Oliver Cromwell, Protector of England

Aristocrats and non-ruling royals 

 Richard fitz Gilbert (before 1035 – c. 1090), Norman lord involved in the conquest of England
 Richard de Clare, 6th Earl of Gloucester (1222–1262)
 Richard of Conisburgh, 3rd Earl of Cambridge
 Richard Óg de Burgh, 2nd Earl of Ulster (1259–1326)
 Richard Orsini (died 1304), Count Palatine of Cephalonia and Zakynthos, Count of Gravina, Bailli of Achaea
 Richard Neville, 5th Earl of Salisbury (1400–1460), Yorkist leader in the Wars of the Roses
 Richard of York, 3rd Duke of York (1411–1460), a principal participant in the Wars of the Roses
 Richard Neville, 5th Earl of Salisbury
 Richard Neville, 16th Earl of Warwick (1428–1471), wealthy English magnate and major protagonist in the Wars of the Roses
 Richard of Shrewsbury, 1st Duke of York (1473 – c. 1483), who would have been King Richard IV of England if he had lived
 Richard Boyle, 3rd Earl of Burlington (1694–1753), instrumental in the revival of Palladian architecture
 Richard Temple-Nugent-Brydges-Chandos-Grenville, 1st Duke of Buckingham and Chandos
 Richard Temple-Nugent-Brydges-Chandos-Grenville, 2nd Duke of Buckingham and Chandos (1797–1861), noted for squandering his great wealth
 Richard Temple-Nugent-Brydges-Chandos-Grenville, 3rd Duke of Buckingham and Chandos (1823–1889), British soldier, politician and administrator
 Prince Richard von Metternich (1829–1895), Austrian diplomat
 Richard, 6th Prince of Sayn-Wittgenstein-Berleburg (1934–2017), German-Swedish aristocrat and landowner, husband of Princess Benedikte of Denmark
 Prince Richard, Duke of Gloucester (born 1944), British royal

Religious figures 

 Saint Richard (disambiguation), several saints
 Richard Baxter (1615–1691), English Puritan church leader, poet and  hymn-writer
 Richard of Dover (died 1184), Benedictine monk and Archbishop of Canterbury
 Richard Foxe (c. 1448 – 1528), Bishop of Exeter, Bath and Wells, Durham, and Winchester, Lord Privy Seal, and founder of Corpus Christi College, Oxford
 Richard Furman (1755–1825), American Baptist leader, first president of the Triennial Convention, the first nationwide Baptist association
 Richard von Greiffenklau zu Vollrads (1467–1531), Archbishop-Elector of Trier from 1511 to 1531
 Richard of Poitiers (died c. 1174), French monk, author of historical works, treatises and poems
 Richard Poore (died 1237), Bishop of Salisbury and Durham, who helped found Salisbury Cathedral in its present location
 Richard Swinefield (died 1317), Bishop of Hereford

In politics and government 

 Richard Acland (1906–1990), one of the founders of the British Common Wealth Party and the Campaign for Nuclear Disarmament
 Richard B. Adkisson (1932–2011), chief justice of the Arkansas Supreme Court
 Richard Aluwihare (1895–1976), Sri Lankan diplomat
 Dick Armey (born 1940), American politician, member US House of Representatives from Texas (1985–2003)
 Richard Armitage (politician) (born 1945), American government official, Deputy Secretary of State (2001–2005)
 Richard Arrington Jr. (born 1934), first African-American mayor of the city of Birmingham, Alabama
 R. B. Bennett (1870–1947), Canadian politician, Prime Minister of Canada (1930–1935)
 Richard Blumenthal (born 1946), American politician, US Senator from Connecticut (2010–present)
 Richard Boyle, 1st Earl of Burlington (1612–1698), Lord High Treasurer of Ireland and a cavalier
 Richard Leslie Brohier (1892–1980), Sri Lankan Burgher land surveyor and author
 Richard Burr (born 1955), American politician, US Senator from North Carolina (2005–present)
 Dick Cheney (born 1941), American politician, Congressman from Wyoming (1979–1989), Secretary of Defense (1989–1993) and Vice President (2001–2009)
 Dick Clark (senator) (born 1928), American politician, US Senator from Iowa (1973–1979)
 Richard Court (born 1947), Australian politician, Premier of Western Australia (1993–2001)
 Richard J. Daley (1902–1976), American politician, Mayor of Chicago (1955–1976)
 Richard M. Daley (born 1942), American politician, Illinois state senator (1972–1980) and Mayor of Chicago (1989–2011)
 Richard Darman (1943–2008), American politician, White House Staff Secretary (1981–1985), Deputy Secretary of the Treasury (1985–1987) and OMB Director (1989–1993)
 Dick Durbin (born 1944), American politician, US senator from Illinois (1997–present), Democratic Senate Whip (2005–present)
 Richard Grenville-Temple, 2nd Earl Temple (1711–1779), British politician and associate and brother-in-law of William Pitt
 Richard J. Gordon (born 1945) Filipino politician and broadcaster
 Richard Haldane, 1st Viscount Haldane, British nobleman and politician
 Richard Hatfield (1931–1991), Canadian politician, Premier of New Brunswick (1970–1987)
 Richard Helms (1913–2002), American government official, Director of Central Intelligence (1966–1973), US Ambassador to Iran (1973–1977)
 Junius Richard Jayewardene (1906–1996), President of Sri Lanka from 1978 to 1989
 Richard Johnson (judge) (1937–2019), Irish jurist, President of the Irish High Court (2006–2009)
 Richard Jones, 1st Earl of Ranelagh (1641–1712), Irish peer, and politician both in the Parliaments of England and Ireland
 Richard Charles Kannangara (1920-1946), Sri Lankan Sinhala representative in the State Council of Ceylon for Morawaka
 Richard Lovell Edgeworth (1744–1817) Anglo-Irish politician, writer and inventor
 Richard Lugar (1932–2019), American politician, US Senator from Indiana (1977–2011)
 Richard Mentor Johnson (1780–1850), American politician, US Congressman from Kentucky (1807–19 and 1829–33), US Senator from Kentucky (1819–1829) and Vice President (1837–41)
 Dick Murphy, (born 1942) American politician who served as the 33rd Mayor of San Diego, California
 Richard L. Murphy (1875–1936), Democratic US Senator from Iowa
 Richard W. Murphy (born 1929),  American diplomat and career member of the foreign service
 Richard Nixon (1913–1994), American politician, President of the United States (1969–1974) and Vice President (1953–1961)
 Richard Pathirana (1938-2008), Sri Lankan Sinhala politician and educationist
 Richard Pelpola (1898-1971), Sri Lankan Sinhala politician, Speaker of the Parliament of Sri Lanka
 Richard Perle (born 1941), American government official and foreign policy specialist, Assistant Secretary of Defense for Global Strategic Affairs 1981–1987
 Richard F. Pettigrew (1848–1926), American lawyer, surveyor, and land developer
 Richard Abusua-Yedom Quarshie, Ghanaian businessman and diplomat
 Richard Rush (1780–1859), American politician, US Attorney General (1814–1817) and Secretary of the Treasury (1825–1829)
 Richard "Rick" Santorum, American politician, attorney and political commentator
 Rick Scott (born 1952), American politician, US Senator from Florida (2019–present), Governor of Florida (2011–2019)
 Richard Seddon (1845–1906), New Zealand politician, Prime Minister of New Zealand (1893–1906)
 Richard Gotabhaya Senanayake (1911-1970), Sri Lankan Sinhala Cabinet Minister
 Richard Shelby (born 1934), American politician, US Senator from Alabama (1987–present)
 Richard Stockton (U.S. senator) (1764–1828), American politician, US Senator from New Jersey (1796–1799), Member of the US House of Representatives (1813–1815)
 Dick Thornburgh (1932–2020), American politician, Governor of Pennsylvania (1979–1987) and US Attorney General (1988–1991)
 Richard Tötterman (1926–2020), Finnish diplomat
 Richard Udugama, (1911–1995), major general, Commander of the Sri Lanka Army from 1964 to 1966, politician
 Richard von Weizsäcker (1920–2015), German politician, Governing Mayor of West Berlin (1981–1984) and President of the Federal Republic of Germany (1984–1994)
 Richard Wellesley, 1st Marquess Wellesley (1760–1842), Anglo-Irish Governor-General of India, Foreign Secretary in the British Cabinet and Lord Lieutenant of Ireland
 Richard C. Wilbur (1936–2020), judge of the United States Tax Court
 Richard Wild (judge) (1912–1978), New Zealand jurist, Chief Justice of New Zealand (1966–1978)

In business 
 Richard L. Bloch (1929–2018), American investor, real estate developer, banker, and philanthropist
 Richard Branson (born 1950), British businessman and founder of the Virgin Group of companies
 Richard Deeb (1924–1990), real estate developer
 Richard DeVos (1926–2018), American businessman and co-founder of Amway
 Richard Jacobs (businessman) (1925–2009), real estate businessman and owner of the Cleveland Indians baseball team
 Richard Morefield (1929–2010), American diplomat
 Richard Oetker (born 1951), German businessman, CEO of Dr. Oetker since 2010
 Richard Rawlings (born 1969), star of American television show Fast N' Loud, owner of Gas Monkey garage, Gas Monkey Bar N' Grill and Gas Monkey Live
 Richard Warren Sears (1863–1914), co-founder of Sears, Roebuck and Company, and considered a promotional genius
 Richard Velazquez (born 1973), PepsiCo executive and first automotive designer at Porsche AG (Germany) of Puerto Rican descent
 Richard Wilding, British businessman and academic

In music

Composers 

 Richard Dybeck (1811–1877), Swedish lyricist who wrote the national anthem of Sweden
 Richard Heuberger (1850–1924), Austrian composer of operas and operettas, music critic, and teacher
 Richard D. James (musician) (born 1971), British composer and electronic musician, records music as Aphex Twin, among other monikers
 Richard Mohaupt (1904–1957), German-American composer and conductor
 Dick Oatts, American jazz saxophonist, multi-instrumentalist, composer, and educator
 Richard Strauss (1864–1949), German composer and conductor
 Richard Wagner (1813–1883), German composer, writer, conductor and theatre director
 Rich Batsford pianist, composer and singer songwriter

Singers and musicians 

 Richard "Big Daddy Ritch" Anderson, lead vocalist for American red dirt metal band Texas Hippie Coalition
 Richard Ashcroft (born 1971), former singer with The Verve
 Ritchie Blackmore (born 1945), lead guitarist of Deep Purple, Rainbow, Blackmore's Night
 Richard Butler (singer) (born 1956), lead singer of the Psychedelic Furs
 Richard Carpenter (musician) (born 1946), one half of The Carpenters
 Rick Chertoff, American music producer
 Rick Danko (1943–1999), bassist and singer for The Band
 Richard Sulogowski (born 1955), American heavy metal bassist known as Rik Fox
 Richie Havens (1941-2013), American singer-songwriter and guitarist
 Richard Henshall (born 1984), main composer, guitarist and keyboardist of Haken
 Richard Kruspe (born 1967), lead guitarist of Rammstein
 Richard Manuel (1943–1986), pianist and vocalist of The Band
 Richard Marx (born 1963), American singer-songwriter
 Richard Lewis (tenor) (1914–1990), British tenor
 Richard Patrick (born 1968), lead singer and guitarist of Filter
 Richard Wayne Penniman (1932–2020), birth name of Little Richard, American rock and roll singer
 Rich Perry, American jazz tenor saxophonist
 Richard Starkey (born 1940), birth name of Ringo Starr, drummer of The Beatles
 Richard Tauber (1891–1948), Austrian tenor
 Richard Thompson (musician) (born 1949), singer, songwriter and guitarist
 Ritchie Valens (1941–1959), singer, songwriter and guitarist
 Richard Wright (musician) (1943–2008), keyboard player for Pink Floyd
 Richard "Richie" Giese, known as Social Repose, American singer-songwriter and YouTube personality
 Wiley (musician), full name Richard "Wiley" Cowie (born 1979), pioneer of grime music

Actors 

 Richard Dean Anderson (born 1950), American actor
 Richard Armitage (actor) (born 1971), English actor
 Richard Attenborough (1923–2014), English actor, director, producer and entrepreneur
 Richard Ayoade (born 1977), English comedian, actor, writer and director
 Richard Belzer (1944-2023), American actor, author, and stand-up comedian
 Richard Beymer (born 1938), American actor, filmmaker and artist
 Richard Biggs (1960–2004), American television and stage actor
 Richard Boone (1917-1981), American actor
 Richard Brake (born 1964), Welsh-American actor
 Richard Burbage (1568–1619), English actor and theatre owner
 Richard Burton (1925–1984), Welsh actor
 Dick Cavett (born 1936), American television talk show host
 Richard Chamberlain (born 1934), American actor
 Dick Clark (1929–2012) was an American radio and television personality
 Richard Curtis (born 1956), British screenwriter, music producer, actor and film director
 Richard Dreyfuss (born 1947), American actor
 Richard Dysart (1929–2015), American actor
 Richard Fleeshman (born 1989), English actor and singer
 Richard Franklin (actor), (born 1936), English actor, writer, director and political activist
 Richard Gere (born 1949), American actor
 Richard Gomez (born 1966), Filipino athlete, television presenter, actor, director and politician
 Richard E. Grant (born 1957), English actor
 Richard Grieco (born 1965), American actor
 Richard Gutierrez (born 1984), Filipino actor
 Richard Harris (1930–2002), Irish actor, singer-songwriter, theatrical producer, film director and writer
 Richard Heffer (born 1946), British television and film actor
 Richard Steven Horvitz (born 1966), American actor and comedian
 Richard Jaeckel (1926–1997), American actor
 Richard Kiel (1939–2014), American actor
 Richard Kind (born 1956), American actor
 Richard Madden (born 1986), Scottish actor
 Cheech Marin (Richard Anthony Marin, born 1946), American actor and comedian, known for the comedy duo Cheech & Chong
 Richard Pryor (1940–2005) an American stand-up comedian and actor
 Richard Roundtree (born 1942), American actor
 Richard Roxburgh (born 1962), Australian actor
 Richard Schulefand (1923–1987), American actor and comedian professionally known as Dick Shawn
 Peter Sellers (1925–1980), British actor born Richard Henry Sellers
 Richard Herbert Seneviratne (1925-1998), Sri Lankan Sinhala actor and filmmaker
 Richard Simmons (actor) (1913–2003), American actor
 Richard Simmons (born 1948), American fitness personality and actor
 Richard Speight, Jr. (born 1970), American actor
 Richard Thomas (actor) (born 1951), American actor
 Richard Todd (1919–2009), Irish-born English actor
 Dick Van Dyke (born 1925), American actor, comedian, writer and producer
 Richard Widmark (1914-2008), American actor
 Richard Yap (born 1967), Filipino actor, singer, and model

In film and television 

 Richard Donner (1930–2021), American film director and producer
 Richard Edlund (born 1940), American special effects cinematographer
 Richard Hatch (actor) (1945–2017), American actor, writer and producer
 Richard Hatch (Survivor contestant) (born 1961), American television personality, winner of Survivor: Borneo
 Richard Hammond (born 1969), British television presenter
 Richard Hunt (puppeteer) (1951–1992), American puppeteer who performed a number of the Muppets
 Richard Juan (born 1992), Hong Kong model and television host based in the Philippines
 Richard Lester (born 1932), American film director based in the UK
 Richard Linklater (born 1960), Texas filmmaker 
 Richard Osman (born 1970), British television presenter and author
 Rich Vos (born 1957), American comedian
 Richard Whiteley (1943–2005), British television personality and journalist
 Richard Whitley (born 1948), American screenwriter and producer
 Richard Williams (animator) (1933–2019), Canadian-British animator
 Richard D. Zanuck (1934–2012), American film producer
 Richard Wenk, director and screenwriter of multiple films including Vamp (1986)

Explorers 

 Richard R. Arnold (born 1963), American astronaut
 Richard Francis Burton (1821–1890), British geographer, explorer, translator, writer, soldier, orientalist, cartographer, ethnologist, spy, linguist, poet, fencer and diplomat
 Richard E. Byrd (1888–1957), US Navy rear admiral, aviator and explorer
 Richard Masters (aka William Marsters), English sailor, cooper, trader and explorer
 Dick Rutkowski, diving medicine pioneer

Scientists 

 Richard Lee Armstrong (1937–1991), American-Canadian geologist
 Richard Dawkins (born 1941), English ethologist, evolutionary biologist and author
 Richard Feynman (1918–1988), American Nobel Prize-winning physicist
 Richard Hall (archaeologist) (1949–2011), English archaeologist
 Richard D. Hansen, American archaeologist
 Richard D. James (scientist) (born 1952), American mechanician and materials scientist
 Richard Klophaus (born 1965), German economist
 Richard von Krafft-Ebing (1840–1902), Austro-German baron, psychiatrist and author of the foundational work Psychopathia Sexualis.
 Richard Leakey (1944–2022), politician, paleoanthropologist and conservationist
 Richard Pringle, American psychologist and professor
 Richard Beck (scholar) (1897–1980), American literary historian
 Richard von Mises (1883–1953), Austrian-American scientist and mathematician
 Richard Bruce Paris (1946–2022), British mathematician
 Richard Smalley (1943–2005), American chemist
 Richard Swedberg (born 1948), Swedish sociologist at Cornell University

In sports 

 Dick Attlesey (1929–1984), American hurdler
 Dick Ault (1925–2007), American Olympian
 Rink Babka (1936–2022), American discus thrower
 Dick Barber (1910–1983), American long jumper
 Richard Bleier (born 1987), major league baseball pitcher for the New York Yankees and Baltimore Orioles
 Dick Butkus (born 1942), American footballer and actor
 Richard Chelimo (1972–2001), Kenyan long-distance runner
 Richard Childress (born 1945), NASCAR Cup Series team owner and former American race car driver
 Dick Davis (running back) (born 1946), American football player
 Dick Davis (defensive end) (born 1938), American football player
Richard Fellers (born 1959), American Olympic equestrian 
Dick Fencl (1910–1972), American football player
 Richard Fliehr (born 1949), American professional wrestler known as Ric Flair
 Richard Freitag (born 1991), German ski jumper
 Richard Gasquet (born 1986), French tennis player
 Richard Giachetti, former NASCAR Cup Series team owner
 Richard Gleeson, (born 1987) an English cricketer
 Sir Richard Hadlee, New Zealand cricketer
 Rick Hansen (born 1957), Canadian paraplegic athlete, activist and philanthropist
 Rickey Henderson (born 1958), American baseball left fielder
 Rich Houston (1945–1982), American football player
 Richard Howell (born 1990), American-Israeli basketball player in the Israeli Basketball Premier League
 Richard Jarvis (American football) (born 1995), American football player
 Richard Johansson (1882–1952), Swedish figure skater, silver medalist at the 1908 Olympics
 Dick Johnson (racing driver) (born 1945), Australian touring car driver & team owner
 Richard Jordan (American football) (born 1972), American football player
 Richard Kilty (born 1989), English sprinter
 Richard Kingi (born 1989), Australian-New Zealand rugby union player
 Richard Krajicek (born 1971), Dutch professional tennis player, Wimbledon winner in 1996
 Rick Lackman (1910–1990), American football player
 Richard Limo (born 1980), Kenyan long-distance runner
 Richard Mateelong (born 1983), Kenyan runner
 Richard Medlin (born 1987), American football player
 Richard Moguena (born 1986), Chadian basketball player
 Richard Mullaney (born 1993), American football player
 Richard Nerurkar (born 1964), British long-distance runner
 Richard Newland (cricketer) (1713–1778), English cricketer
 Richard Ord (born 1970), English former footballer
 Dick Pound (born 1942), Canadian swimmer, first president of the World Anti-Doping Agency, and former vice-president of the International Olympic Committee
 Richard Petruška (born 1969), Slovak-Italian basketball player
 Richard Petty (born 1937), former NASCAR driver
 Richard Raskind, changed name to Renée Richards (born 1934), tennis player
 Dick Savitt (1927–2023), American tennis player
 Richard Sears (tennis) (1861–1943), winner of seven consecutive US tennis championships
 Richard Sherman (American football) (born 1988), defensive back for the Seattle Seahawks
 Dick Stanfel (1927–2015), American football player
 Rich Stotter (1945–2015), American football player
 Dick Schweidler (1914–2010), American football player
 Richard Swann (born 1991), American professional wrestler
 Dick Tayler (born 1948), New Zealand long-distance runner
 Richard Thompson (sprinter) (born 1985), Trinidadian sprinter
 Richard Todd (American football) (born 1953), American football player in the NFL
 Richard Virenque (born 1969), French cyclist
 Richard Washington (born 1955), American basketball player
 Richárd Weisz (1879–1945), Hungarian Olympic champion Greco-Roman wrestler
 Richard Williams (basketball) (born 1987), American basketball player
 Richard Williams (tennis coach) (born 1942), American tennis coach, the father of Venus and Serena Williams
 Richard Witschge (born 1969), Dutch footballer

Soldiers, pilots, other military/security 

 Richard Baer (1911–1963), German Nazi SS concentration camp commandant
 Richard von Conta, German general, notable for his participation in the Battle of Belleau Wood
 Richard F. Gordon Jr. (1929–2017), American naval officer and aviator, chemist, test pilot, and NASA astronaut, and an American football executive
 Richard FitzAlan, 10th Earl of Arundel (c. 1306–1376), English military leader
 Richard FitzAlan, 11th Earl of Arundel (1346–1397), English military commander
 Richard G. Graves, retired lieutenant general in the United States Army, commander of III Corps and Fort Hood
 Richard H. Truly (born 1937), US Navy fighter pilot, engineer, former astronaut for both the US Air Force and NASA, and NASA's Administrator
 Richard Howe, 1st Earl Howe (1726–1799), British naval commander in the American War of Independence and the French Revolutionary Wars
 Rick Husband (1957–2003), American astronaut and fighter pilot
 Richard M. Linnehan (born 1957), United States Army veterinarian and a NASA astronaut
 Richard Marcinko (1940–2021), US Navy SEAL commander and Vietnam War veteran
 Richard Michael Mullane (born 1945), engineer and aircraft pilot, a retired USAF officer
 Richard Myers (born 1942), US Air Force general, Vice Chairman of the Joint Chiefs of Staff (2000–2001) and Chairman (2001–2005)
 Richard N. Richards (born 1946), retired American naval officer and aviator, test pilot, chemical engineer, and a former NASA astronaut
 Richard Ruoff, general in the Wehrmacht of Nazi Germany
 Richard O'Connor (1889–1981), British Army officer and military commander
 Richard O. Covey (born 1946), United States Air Force officer and former NASA astronaut
 Richard Savage, 4th Earl Rivers (c. 1660 – 1712), soldier and noted rake
 Dick Scobee (1939–1986), American pilot, engineer and astronaut, killed while commanding the Space Shuttle Challenger
 Richard A. Searfoss (1956–2018), American aviator who was United States Air Force colonel, NASA astronaut and test pilot
 Richard Sorge (1895–1944), Soviet World War II spy
 Richard Taylor (Confederate general) (1826–1879), American Civil War Confederate general
 Richard Thomalla (1903–1945), SS commander of Nazi Germany, civil engineer, head of the SS Central Building Administration
 Richard Udugama (1911–1995), 6th Commander of the Sri Lanka Army
 Richard von Hegener (1905–1981), German official, primary organizer of Action T4 Nazi euthanasia program
 Richard Winters (1918–2011), US Army major and Second World War veteran
 Richard von Schubert, German army commander

Writers and journalists
 Richard Adams (1920–2016), English author, best known for the novel Watership Down
 Richard Argall ( 1621), a poet, of whom little is known and whose existence is disputed
 Richard Armstrong (author) (1903–1986), English author, recipient of the 1948 Carnegie medal for children's literature
 Richard Engel (born 1973), American journalist and author
 Richard Herrmann (journalist) (1919–2010), Norwegian journalist, writer and radio personality
 Richard Scarry (1919–1994), American children's author and illustrator, known for his "Busytown" fictional universe and multimedia franchise
 Richard Wright (author) (1908–1960), novelist, poet, essayist, short story writer
 Richard de Zoysa (1958–1990), Sri Lankan journalist, author, human rights activist and actor who was abducted and murdered
 Rick Riordan (born 1964), American author, creator of the series Percy Jackson & the Olympians

Crime 
 Richard Angelo (born 1962), American serial killer and former nurse
 Richard H. Barter (1833–1859), Canadian fugitive and murder victim
 Richard Baumhammers (born 1965), American former immigration attorney and spree killer 
 Richard Biegenwald (1940–2008), American serial killer
 Richard Michael Cartwright (1974–2005), American murderer
 Richard Chase (1950–1980), American cannibalistic serial killer, mass murderer, and necrophile
 Richard Clarey (born 1960), German-American murderer and self-confessed serial killer
 Richard Cooey (1967–2008), American murderer
 Richard Cottingham (born 1946), American serial killer
 Richard Allen Davis (born 1954), American career criminal and convicted killer of Polly Klaas
 Richard Evonitz (1963–2002), American serial killer, kidnapper, and rapist
 Richard Farley (born 1948), American stalker, later mass murderer and workplace shooter
 Richard Hauptmann (1899–1936), perpetrator of the Lindbergh kidnapping
 Richard Hickock (1931–1965), American mass murderer who killed the Clutter family with Perry Smith
 Richard James (1957–1975), convicted murderer in Singapore
 Richard "Ricky" Kasso Jr (1967–1984), American murderer
 Richard Kuklinski (1935–2006), American hitman and serial killer
 Richard Laurence Marquette (born 1934), American convicted serial killer
 Richard Matt (1966–2015), American convicted murderer and prison escapee
 Richard Ramirez (1960–2013), American serial killer, rapist, and burglar
 Richard Speck (1941–1991), American rapist and mass murderer

Other 

 Richard R. Arnold (born 1963), American educator and a NASA astronaut
 Dick Assman (1934–2016), Canadian gas station owner
 Richard Avedon (1923–2004), American fashion and portrait photographer
 Richard Bergh (1858–1919), Swedish painter
 Richard Blackwell ("Mr. Blackwell", 19222008), American fashion critic best known for his annual "worst dressed" lists 
 Richard Tyler Blevins (born 1991), American professional gamer, Mixer streamer and YouTube personality
 Richard von Coudenhove-Kalergi (1894–1972), Austrian-Japanese count, founding president of the Paneuropean Union
 Richard Everitt (1979–1994), victim of the racially motivated Murder of Richard Everitt in London
 Richard Garriott (born 1961), British-American video game developer, entrepreneur and private astronaut
 Richard Gerstl (1883–1908), Austrian painter
 Richard Harris (anaesthetist), Australian anaesthetist and cave diver
 Richard Heber (1773–1833), English book-collector
 Richard Helms (naturalist) (1842–1914), Australian naturalist
 Richard Hieb (born 1955), former NASA astronaut and a veteran of three space shuttle missions
 Richard Ling (born 1954), Shaw Foundation professor of Media Technology at Nanyang Technological University, Singapore
 Richard Lugner (born 1932), Austrian entrepreneur and Viennese society figure
 Richard Mastracchio (born 1960), American engineer and former NASA astronaut
 Richard Maury (1882–1950), American naturalized Argentine engineer
 Richard Murphy (Captain) (1838–1916), Gloucester, Massachusetts fishing schooner captain
 Richard Samuel (1770–1786), English portrait painter
 Dick Turpin (1705–1739), English Highwayman
 Richard von Volkmann (1830–1889), German surgeon and author of poetry and fiction
 Richard Wurmbrand, Romanian Evangelical Lutheran priest and professor

Fictional characters 
 Richard, title character of the 2017 animated film Richard the Stork
 Richard, a character in 1989 American independent coming of age comedy movie She's Out of Control
 Richard, a character in the 2013 American black comedy crime film Life of Crime
 Richard, a character in the American Lego TV series, Unikitty!
 Richard Ashenden, main character in the 1936 Hitchcock film Secret Agent (1936 film)
 Richard Blaine, main character in the 1942 film Casablanca
 Richard Blaney, main character in the film Frenzy
 Richard Cobb, one of the main characters in the 1940 American horror science fiction film The Invisible Man Returns
 Richard Cole, a character in the film Liar Liar
 Richard Cole, a journalist in The Power Of Five Series, and Matthew Freeman's best friend and protector
Dick Dastardly, a character from various Hanna-Barbera cartoons
 Rick Deckard, the title character in the film Blade Runner
 Richard Diamond, private detective protagonist of Richard Diamond, Private Detective, which aired on radio from 1949 to 1953, and on television from 1957 to 1960.
 Richard Fenton, in the 1994 miniseries, Scarlett (miniseries)
 Richard John "Dick" Grayson, the first Robin, Batman's sidekick
 Richard Hannay, main character in the novel The Thirty Nine Steps
 Richard Hillman, serial killer in the British soap opera Coronation Street
 Richard Kimble, lead character in 1963 American TV series The Fugitive
 Richard Mayhew, main character in the television series Neverwhere
 Richard Rank, a character in the 1997 American science fiction drama movie Contact
 Richie Rich (comics), main character of the Richie Rich series
 Richard Richard, one of the protagonists of British sitcom Bottom
 Richie Ryan (Highlander), one of the main characters on Highlander: The Series, played by Stan Kirsch
 Rick Sanchez, main character on Rick and Morty
 Richard Sharpe, main character in the Sharpe novel series, portrayed by Sean Bean in TV adaptations
 Richard Bluedhorn "Rick" or "Ricky" Stratton, the main character in the American TV sitcom Silver Spoons
 Richard Vincent, in the 2001 miniseries The SoulTaker, the father of the title character
 Richard Watterson, a character from the 2011 TV series The Amazing World of Gumball
 Richard Wheatley, a villain from the TV series Law & Order: Special Victims Unit
 Prince Richard, in the 1992 Nintendo Game Boy game For the Frog the Bell Tolls

Cognates/transliterations

In Indo-European languages

Baltic 

 Latvian: Ričards, Rihards, Rišārs
 Lithuanian: Ričardas

Celtic 

 Breton: Richarzh
 Cornish: Richard
 Irish: Risteárd, Riocard
 Manx: Rigard
 Scottish Gaelic: Ruiseart
 Welsh: Rhisiart

Germanic 

 Afrikaans: Riekert, Ryk, Rigard, Righard, Reghard
 Danish: Rikard, Ryker, Richard
 Dutch: Rijkert, Rikkert, Ryker, Rigard, Richard
 Gothic: RekkareÞ (Reccared)
 Icelandic: Ríkharð, Ríkharður
 German: Rieker, Ri(c)kert, Riker, Richard
 Norwegian: Rikard, Richard
 Swedish: Rikard, Richard, Rickard

Romance 

 Catalan: Ricard
 Occitan: Ricard
 French: Richard, pronounced as /ʁi.ʃaʁ/
 Italian: Riccardo
 Latin: Ricardus, or Richardus
 Portuguese: Ricardo
 Spanish: Ricardo

Slavic 

 Belarusian: Рычард (Ryčard)
 Croatian: Rikard
 Czech: Richard
 Polish: Ryszard
 Russian: Ричард (Richard)
 Slovak: Richard
 Slovene: Rihard
 Ukrainian: Річард (Richard)

Other Indo-European 

 Albanian: Riçard
 Armenian: Հռիքարտոս (Hṙikartós)
 Greek: Ριχάρδος (Richárdos)
 Persian: ریچارد (Rīchārd)

In Semitic languages 

 Arabic: ريتشارد (Rytshrd, Ritshrd, Rytshard, Ritshard)
 Hebrew: ריצ'רד (Richard)

In Turkic languages 

 Azerbaijani: Riçard
 Turkish: Rişar

In Uralic languages 

 Estonian: Richard
 Finnish: Rikhard, Riku
 Hungarian: Richárd
 Saami: Rikkar

In other languages 

 Basque: Rikard

 Chinese: 理查德 (Lǐchádé), 理查 (Lǐchá)

 Esperanto: Rikardo
 Japanese: リチャード (Richādo)
 Korean: 리처드
 Māori: Riki

Short forms 

 Cornish: Hicca
 Czech: Ríša, Rik (Riker)
 Dutch: Ries
 English: Rick, Rich, Richie, Dick, Dicky, Dickie, Ric, Rik, Ricky, Rickie, Dickon
 Estonian: Riho
 Esperanto: Rikĉjo
 Finnish: Riku
 Greek: Στούκος (Stoúkos)
 Hungarian: Ricsi, Ricsike, Rics
 Icelandic: Rikki
 Italian: Ricky, Riki, Richi
 Latvian: Ričs
 Lithuanian: Ryčka, Rytis
 Polish: Rysio, Rysiek, Ryś
 Portuguese: Rico, Ric
 Slovak: Rišo, Riško, Riči
 Spanish: Cayo (Guatemala)
 Swiss/German: Richi

Nicknames 

 English: Ricky, Rickie, Rikki, Richie, Rich, Dick, Dicky, Dickie, Ritchie, Richi

See also 

 Richarda
 Richardis (given name)
 Dickon, a given name derived from the old English name for Richard

References 

English masculine given names
Germanic given names
Masculine given names